Côme Isaïe Rinfret (September 6, 1847 – November 8, 1911) was a Canadian physician and politician.

Born in Cap-Santé, Portneuf County, Canada East, the son of F. J. Rinfret, Rinfret was educated at the Seminary of Quebec  and studied medicine at Victoria University, Montreal from which he graduated with the degree of M.D. He was first elected to the House of Commons of Canada for the electoral district of Lotbinière in the 1878 federal election. A Liberal, he was re-elected in the 1882, 1887, 1891, and 1896 elections. He resigned in 1899 when he was appointed inspector of Inland Revenue.

Electoral record

References
 
 

1847 births
1911 deaths
Liberal Party of Canada MPs
Members of the House of Commons of Canada from Quebec